Flávio Igor Rodrigues Silva Pereira Ferreira, known as Flávio Igor (born 10 February 1984) is a Portuguese football player who plays for Sousense.

Club career
He made his professional debut in the Segunda Liga for Chaves on 8 November 2009 in a game against Santa Clara.

International
He represented Portugal at the 2003 UEFA European Under-19 Championship, at which Portugal were the runners-up.

References

1984 births
People from Gondomar, Portugal
Living people
Portuguese footballers
FC Porto B players
AC Vila Meã players
F.C. Tirsense players
G.D. Chaves players
Liga Portugal 2 players
F.C. Famalicão players
G.D. Ribeirão players
C.D. Fátima players
Portugal youth international footballers
Association football midfielders
Sportspeople from Porto District